Michel Beaulieu (31 October 1941, Montréal - 10 July 1985) was a Quebec writer.

Life 
He graduated from Collège Jean-de-Brébeuf and then Université de Montréal.

His archive is held at Bibliothèque et Archives nationales du Québec.

After his death in 1985, he was entombed at the Notre Dame des Neiges Cemetery in Montreal.

Honors 
 1973 : Prix de la revue Études françaises (avec Variables)
 1980 : Prix littéraires du Journal de Montréal (avec Desseins)
 1981 : Prix du Gouverneur général : poésie de langue française (avec Visages)
 1985 : Grand Prix du Festival international de la poésie (avec Kaléidoscope)
 2002 : Prix Alain-Grandbois

Works 

Charmes de la fureur Translated by	Arlette Francière, Exile Editions, 1984,

References 

Prix Alain-Grandbois
Writers from Quebec
1941 births
1985 deaths
Canadian male poets
Canadian poets in French
20th-century Canadian poets
20th-century Canadian male writers
Governor General's Award-winning poets
Burials at Notre Dame des Neiges Cemetery